A number of highway junctions in the U.S. state of Utah have names that appear on maps and in state laws designating the highways. Sometimes the junction name also refers to the surrounding community or area as well as just the highway junction itself. In a few instances, the highway junction shares the name with a nearby railroad junction. Such sharing of names does not include the many, many named railroad junctions within the state, some of whose name also refers to the surrounding community or area, but has no relation to any highway junction (for example, Cache Junction). La Sal Junction is a very small town with no running businesses.

There is also a town named Junction (which is the county seat of Piute County) where  and  meet.

Notes

References

External links
Highway Referencing
Highway Resolutions

Junctions
 Junctions
Utah